Curtain Road Arts was an artist-run project housed in an old furniture warehouse in Shoreditch, London, which functioned as a studio and an art project space. It was a centre for a great deal of activity in the 1990s, and included artists such as Glenn Brown, Alex Landrum, Dermot O'Brien, Anya Gallaccio, Cornelia Parker, Angela Bulloch, Stephen Hughes, Dan Hays, Mariele Neudecker, Debbie Curtis, Emma Smith and Michael Stubbs. Curtain Road Arts also housed The Agency Gallery.

Curtain Road Arts ended in 1999, due to rising rents in the now very fashionable Hoxton area. A number of the artists founded a similar smaller project called Mellow Birds, which ran until 2002.

External links
 Michael Stubbs Website

Artist-run centres
English art